Verna Martha Wentworth (June 2, 1889 – March 8, 1974) was an American actress. Her vocal variety led to her being called the "Actress of 100 Voices".

Biography 
Wentworth was born on June 2, 1889 in New York City. After graduating from public school, she attended the National School of Expression. She was one of Minnie Maddern Fiske's proteges and appeared in several stage productions, beginning when she was 17 years old.

Wentworth's long radio career began in the early 1920s. She played The Wintergreen Witch on The Cinnamon Bear (1937) radio program, Annie Wood and Mrs. Littlefield on Crime Classics (1953), and Ma Danields on The Gallant Heart (1944). She portrayed Joe Penner's mother on The Park Avenue Penners. She also had semi-regular roles on Broadway Is My Beat, On Stage, The Witch's Tale, The Baby Snooks Show, and The Abbott and Costello Show. She voiced Mama Katzenjammer in the Katzenjammer Kids adaptation of The Captain and the Kids.

In the 1940s, Wentworth became a film actress in several Red Ryder Western films. She is in Lassie as neighbor Bertha, first aired on March 22, 1959's season 5 episode 29. She voiced roles in two Walt Disney Productions: Nanny, Queenie the Cow and Lucy the Goose in One Hundred and One Dalmatians (1961) and Madame Mim in The Sword in the Stone (1963), her final credited film appearance.

Wentworth died on March 8, 1974, aged 84.

Selected filmography

Poor Little Me (1935, short) - Singer (voice, uncredited)
Who Killed Cock Robin? (1935, short) - Jenny Wren (voice, uncredited)
Broken Toys (1935, short) - ZaSu Pitts, Mae West (voice, uncredited)
Bottles (1936, short) - Witch Hazel (voice, uncredited)
The Blow Out (1936, Looney Tunes short) - The Mad Bomber (voice, uncredited)
Prison Shadows (1936) - Mrs. Murphy (uncredited)
I Love to Singa (1936, Merrie Melodies short) - Mother Owl (voice, uncredited)
The Old House (1936, short) - Radio Witch (voice, uncredited)
Toby Tortoise Returns (1936, short) - Jenny Wren (voice, uncredited)
At Your Service Madame (1936, Merrie Melodies short) - Mrs. Hamhock (voice, uncredited)
The CooCoo Nut Grove (1936, Merrie Melodies short) - Mae West (voice, uncredited)
Little Cheeser (1936, short) - Mother (voice, uncredited)
Pigs Is Pigs (1937, Merrie Melodies short) - Mrs. Hamhock (voice, uncredited)
The Masque Raid (1937, short) - Witch (voice, uncredited)
Cleaning House (1938, short) - Mama (voice, uncredited)
Blue Monday (1938, short) - Mama (voice, uncredited)
The Captain's Pup (1938, short) - Mama (voice, uncredited)
A Day at the Beach (1938, short) - Mama (voice, uncredited)
Old Smokey (1938, short) - Mama (voice, uncredited)
The Kangaroo Kid (1938, short) - Mother Kangaroo (voice, uncredited)
Petunia Natural Park (1939, short) - Mama (voice, uncredited)
The Bookworm (1939, short) - Witch (voice, uncredited)
Peace on Earth (1939, short) - Mother Squirrel (voice, uncredited)
A Rainy Day (1940, short) - Mama Bear (voice, uncredited)
Waterloo Bridge (1940) - Tart on Bridge at the End (uncredited)
Wildcat Bus (1940) - Mrs. Waters (uncredited)
Papa Gets the Bird (1940, short) - Mama Bear (voice, uncredited)
Who Killed Aunt Maggie? (1940) - Housekeeper (uncredited)
Bowery Blitzkrieg (1941) - Mrs. Brady
Dr. Jekyll and Mr. Hyde (1941) - Landlady (uncredited)
The Field Mouse (1941, short) - Ma Mouse (voice, uncredited)
Fraidy Cat (1942, Tom and Jerry short) - woman in "witching hour" radio program (voice, uncredited)
The Hungry Wolf (1942, short) - Mother Rabbit (voice, uncredited)
The Adventures of Martin Eden (1942) - Proprietress (uncredited)
Rudyard Kipling's Jungle Book (1942) - White Hood (voice, uncredited)
Clancy Street Boys (1943) - Mrs. Molly McGinnis
Strange Affair (1944) - Proprietress (uncredited)
A Tree Grows in Brooklyn (1945) - Sheila's Mother (uncredited)
Fallen Angel (1945) - Hotel Maid (uncredited)
Adventure (1945) - Woman (uncredited)
The Stranger (1946) - Sara
Santa Fe Uprising (1946) - The Duchess
Stagecoach to Denver (1946) - The Duchess (Red's Aunt)
Vigilantes of Boomtown (1947) - Duchess Wentworth
Oregon Trail Scouts (1947) - The Duchess
Rustlers of Devil's Canyon (1947) - The Duchess
Marshal of Cripple Creek (1947) - The Duchess
His Bitter Half (1950, Merrie Melodies short) - Daffy Duck's wife (voice, uncredited)
Love Nest (1951) - Mrs. Thompson (uncredited)
She Couldn't Say No (1952) - Mrs. Holbert (uncredited)
Young Man with Ideas (1952) - Mrs. Hammerty
Willie the Kid (1952, short) - Myrtle Smith (voice, uncredited)
You for Me (1952) - Lucille's Mother (uncredited)
O. Henry's Full House (1952) - Mrs. O'Brien (segment "The Last Leaf") (uncredited)
My Man and I (1952) - Nancy's Landlady (uncredited)
The Clown (1953) - Neighbor (uncredited)
One Girl's Confession (1953) - Old Lady
The Human Jungle (1954) - Marcy, Janitress (uncredited)
Jupiter's Darling (1955) - Widow Titus
Blackboard Jungle (1955) - Mrs. Lucy Brophy (uncredited)
Artists and Models (1955) - Fat Lady (uncredited)
Good Morning, Miss Dove (1955) - Annie Holloway (uncredited)
The Man with the Golden Arm (1955) - Vangie (uncredited)
The Killer Is Loose (1956) - Apartment House Manager's Wife (uncredited)
Rock Around the Clock (1956) - Miss Anna Dunlap - Chaperone (uncredited)
The Desperados Are in Town (1956) - Mrs. Joan Tawson (uncredited)
Monkey on My Back (1957) - Landlady (uncredited)
The Daughter of Dr. Jekyll (1957) - Mrs. Felicity Merchant
Go, Johnny, Go! (1959) - Mrs. Kimberley McGillicuddy
The Beatniks (1960) - Nadine
One Hundred and One Dalmatians (1961) - Nanny / Queenie / Lucy (voice)
The Sword in the Stone (1963) - Madam Mim / Granny Squirrel / Scullery Maid (shared role with Barbara Jo Allen) (voice)
Mary Poppins (1964) - Cockney Cow (voice, uncredited) (final film role)

References

 Wollstein, Hans J., AllMovie.

External links

1889 births
1974 deaths
20th-century American actresses
Actresses from New York City
American film actresses
American radio actresses
American television actresses
Warner Bros. Cartoons voice actors